Major-General August von Kruse (1779 in Wiesbaden, Nassau (modern-day Germany) – January 1848), was a general in the army of the Duke of Nassau during the Napoleonic Wars and an experimental farmer in his retirement.

von Kruse organized the military of the state of Nassau during the Napoleonic Wars, and participated in the lengthy French campaign in the Iberian Peninsula; under secret orders from his Duke, he switched sides in 1814, and fought against the French in northern Europe. He commanded the Nassau infantry brigade at the Battle of Waterloo.

In his retirement, he experimented in new farming and cattle breeding techniques on a small acreage given to him by the Duke of Nassau, exploring the problems in raising healthy cattle.

Family and military career

August von Kruse was born in Wiesbaden in 1779. His father, Karl Friedrich von Kruse (1737–1806), a state official in the service of Nassau-Usingen, wrote several books on husbandry and household management, including Lehrbegriffs der Landwirtschaft und Haushaltungskunste for the Naussau schools in 1780, and Wahren Darstellung der grossen französichen Staatsrevolutions in 1790, which entered into several printings. His mother was Philippina Catherina von Bitburg; he was their only son.

Against the wishes of his father, at the age of 17 he joined the military.  For seven years he served in the military of the Prince of Brunswick-Lüneburg.  On 1 July 1803, he accepted a commission as a captain in the Nassau-Weilburg military. At that time, the army of the principality consisted of two companies.  With the merger of the principality of Nassau Weilburg with Nassau, the army expanded considerably, and Kruse received the rank of major. As a client state of France, Nassau supported Napoleon in the Prussian campaign of 1806. By the end of the campaign, Kruse had been promoted to lieutenant colonel.

In the summer of 1808, Kruse commanded the 2nd Nassau Infantry Regiment No. 88, and fought for the French in the Peninsular War.  On 13 October 1808, the regiment crossed the Spanish border. The Nasssauers participated in 42 battles, including the Battle of Vitoria on 21 June 1813.  On 10 December 1813, as Napoleon's empire crumbled in northern Europe, Kruse received secret orders from the Duke and the Prince of Orange to join the British. He carefully maneuvered his men so they could march to the British line, upon which he announced their change of allegiance.

Nassauers
Commanded by Major General von Kruse:
 1st Battalion, 1st Line Infantry
 2nd Battalion, 1st Line Infantry

Kruse's Nassauers, the 1st Nassau Infantry, were actually on the ridge in Wellington's left center at Waterloo, not at Hougoumont, as is sometimes reported; Wellington apparently was familiar enough with Kruse's actions in the Peninsula to comment to him prior to the battle:  "I hope, General, that your actions today are as clever when you are fighting for me as they were in Spain when you were fighting against me." A small Dutch light infantry battalion was in the woods of Hougoumont throughout the daylong fight there. The 2nd Nassau Infantry, under Prince Bernard of Saxe Weimar, was on the Allied far left at Waterloo.

Awards
von Kruse's decorations included the Grand Cross with Diamonds of the Imperial Russian Order of St. Anne, the Legion of Honour, Nassau's silver Waterloo Medal, and the insignia of a Knight of the Royal Netherlands Military Willems-Order.

As a reward for his service, in 1822 the Duke gave Kruse received a farm by Eisenbach, in the Taunus.  On this  farm, he experimented with new methods of construction and cattle breeding, and published his findings, which formed the basis of new practices in farm management.  He also experimented in the development of social networks to alleviate widespread suffering, such as alcohol abuse. Kruse married Baroness Henriette von Dungern, who died in 1873, and they are both buried on the farm.

References

1779 births
1848 deaths
19th-century German military personnel
Military personnel from Wiesbaden
German commanders of the Napoleonic Wars
Members of the First Chamber of the Estates of the Duchy of Nassau